Chris Penso (born April 28, 1982) is a referee who is active in Major League Soccer.

Career

Penso was raised in Dover, Ohio, and unsuccessfully ran for mayor of the city while studying accounting at Kent State University. He began refereeing in 1997, and also worked at the Transportation Security Administration and the Ohio State Highway Patrol. He quit the state patrol in 2006 to become a full-time referee, and officiated his first Major League Soccer match in 2011.

Penso became FIFA listed in 2013 and his first international assignment was on January 30, 2013, when he refereed a match between Mexico and Denmark. He served as a FIFA referee until 2015. In 2021, Penso was added to the FIFA list as a VAR.

Internationals

Personal life 

Penso's wife, Tori, is a professional referee. In 2020, she became the first woman to referee a Major League Soccer match in 20 years. They have three daughters.

References

External links 
  (archive)

1982 births
Living people
American soccer referees
Major League Soccer referees
CONCACAF Champions League referees
North American Soccer League referees
Place of birth missing (living people)